Princess Lê Thị Ngọc Hân (1770–1799) was a Vietnamese princess of the Later Lê dynasty and Empress Consort of emperor Quang Trung of the Tây Sơn dynasty.

Biography
Lê Thị Ngọc Hân was the twenty-first and youngest daughter of emperor Lê Hiển Tông who arranged her marriage at the age of sixteen to Nguyễn Huệ, who later reigned as Emperor Quang Trung, for whom she left two admirable poems in chữ Nôm, moving laments for her husband.

She herself was memorialized in a lament by Phan Huy Ích.

References

1770 births
1799 deaths
Lê dynasty princesses
Tây Sơn dynasty empresses
18th-century Vietnamese women